People and Masks is a 1913 German silent film directed by Harry Piel and featuring Max Auzinger,
Hubert Moest, Hedda Vernon, and Ludwig Trautmann in the lead roles.

Cast 
Max Auzinger
Hubert Moest
Hedda Vernon
Ludwig Trautmann

References

External links 

Films directed by Harry Piel
German silent short films
German black-and-white films
Films of the German Empire
1910s German films